Kumirmora is a census town in Chanditala I CD Block in Srirampore subdivision of Hooghly district in the state of West Bengal, India.

Geography

Location

Gangadharpur, Manirampur, Masat, Jangalpara, Dudhkalmi, Nababpur, Bhagabatipur, Kumirmora and Ramanathpur form a cluster of census towns in Chanditala I CD Block.

Urbanisation
Srirampore subdivision is the most urbanized of the subdivisions in Hooghly district. 73.13% of the population in the subdivision is urban and 26.88% is rural. The subdivision has 6 municipalities and 34 census towns. The municipalities are: Uttarpara Kotrung Municipality, Konnagar Municipality, Serampore Municipality, Baidyabati Municipality, Rishra Municipality and Dankuni Municipality. Amongst the CD Blocks in the subdivision, Uttarapara Serampore (census towns shown in a separate map) had 76% urban population, Chanditala I 42%, Chanditala II 69% and Jangipara 7% (census towns shown in the map above). All places marked in the map are linked in the larger full screen map.

Demographics
As per 2011 Census of India Kumirmora had a total population of 12,208 of which 6,063 (50%) were males and 6,145 (50%) were females. Population below 6 years was 1,369. The total number of literates in Kumirmora was 9,053 (83.52% of the population over 6 years).

Transport

Railway and road
Janai Road railway station is the nearest railway station on the Howrah-Bardhaman chord of Kolkata Suburban Railway network. The main road is SH 15 (Ahilyabai Holkar Road). It is the main road of the town and is connected to NH 19 (old number NH 2).

Bus Routes

Private Bus Routes
 26 Bonhooghly - Champadanga
 26A Serampore - Aushbati
 26C Bonhooghly - Jagatballavpur

Bus Routes without Numbers
 Howrah Station - Bandar (Dhanyaghori)
 Dakshineswar - Bhagabatipur

References

Census towns in Chanditala I CD Block